Jan Cybis (16 February 1897 - 13 December 1972) was a prominent Polish painter and art teacher.

Biography 

Cybis was born in Fröbel (now Wróblin, Opole Voivodeship, Poland) and studied at the Jan Matejko Academy of Fine Arts in Kraków, settling in that city from 1934.  The German Expressionist Otto Mueller was his mentor.  He studied under Józef Pankiewicz among others, developing a reputation for a post-impressionist style using rich, saturated color influenced by the French.

In the 1930s Cybis was among the most prominent of the Kapists or Paris Committee, a significant group of Polish painters of the time. His wife Hanna Rudzka-Cybisowa (1897-1988) was a notable painter in her own right and also active as a Kapist.

Among other recognitions, Cybis was awarded the Polish communist government's Order of the Banner of Work in 1949 and the Medal of the 10th Anniversary of People's Poland in 1955, although during the Socialist Realism period Cybis was prevented from teaching for ideological reasons.  Among his notable students was Tadeusz Dominik.

Cybis is buried at the Powązki Military Cemetery in Warsaw. His memoirs were published in 1980.

Jan Cybis Award 

Since 1973 the Association of Polish Artists and Designers (Polish acronym ZPAP) has issued a prestigious annual Jan Cybis Award to Polish visual artists for creative achievement. Its recipients include:

 1973 Tadeusz Dominik
 1974 Krzysztof Bucki
 1975 Jan Dziędziora
 1976 Witold Damasiewicz
 1977 Jacek Sempoliński
 1978 Jan Berdyszak
 1979 Rajmund Ziemski
 1980 Stefan Gierowski
 1981 Barbara Jonscher
 1982 no award
 1983 Jacek Sienicki
 1984 Jerzy Tchórzewski
 1985 Jan Lebenstein
 1986 Jerzy Panek
 1987 Jan Tarasin
 1988 Jerzy Nowosielski
 1989 Stanisław Fijałkowski
 1990 Józef Czapski
 1991 Łukasz Korolkiewicz
 1992 Zbigniew Makowski
 1993 Henryk Błachnio
 1994 Jan Dobkowski
 1995 Ryszard Winiarski
 1996 Erna Rosenstein
 1997 Jerzy Mierzejewski
 1998 Leon Tarasewicz
 1999 Tomasz Ciecierski
 2000 Teresa Pągowska
 2001 Jadwiga Maziarska
 2002 Jacek Waltoś
 2003 Aleksandra Jachtoma
 2004 Jarosław Modzelewski
 2005 Jerzy Kałucki
 2006 Andrzej Dłużniewski
 2007 Roman Owidzki
 2008 Tomasz Tatarczyk
 2009 Robert Maciejuk
 2010 Ryszard Grzyb

References 

1897 births
1972 deaths
20th-century Polish painters
20th-century Polish male artists
Burials at Powązki Military Cemetery
Jan Matejko Academy of Fine Arts alumni
People from Prudnik County
Recipients of the Order of the Banner of Work
Polish male painters
Recipients of the State Award Badge (Poland)